Kornfield is a surname. Notable people with the surname include:
Jack Kornfield (born 1945), American author and Theravada Buddhist
Julia A. Kornfield, American chemical engineer
Tyler Kornfield (born  1991), American cross-country skier
Victoria Kornfield, American schoolteacher and politician

See also 
Kornfeld
Cornfield (surname)
Cornfeld